Alfie Clarke (born 18 November 2007) is an English actor, who has appeared as Arthur Thomas in Emmerdale since 22 October 2009.

Early and personal life
Clarke was born in Halifax, West Yorkshire, but lives in Huddersfield, West Yorkshire with his mum Fiona, dad Paul and his younger brother and sister. Clarke attends the Rebel Theatre School in Huddersfield. In May 2017, Clarke raised over 
£5,000 for the Alzheimer's Society by swimming 46 lengths, both over his target, during a dementia storyline in Emmerdale involving Clarke's on-screen father Ashley Thomas, played by John Middleton.

Awards and nominations

References

External links

2007 births
Living people
English male soap opera actors
English male child actors
21st-century English male actors
Male actors from Leeds
Male actors from Huddersfield